Elza Furtado Gomide (August 20, 1925 – October 26, 2013) was a Brazilian mathematician and the first woman to receive a doctorate in mathematics from the University of São Paulo, in 1950, and the second in Brazil Gomide was involved in the creation of the Society of Mathematics of São Paulo and was elected head of the department of mathematics of the University of São Paulo in 1968.

See also
 Marília Chaves Peixoto, another Brazilian mathematician who earned her doctorate in Brazil in 1948.

References 

1925 births
2013 deaths
Brazilian mathematicians
Brazilian women mathematicians
People associated with the University of São Paulo